Włodzimierz Voivodeship was created during the Grodno Sejm in November 23 1793. It was not fully organised because of the start of Kościuszko Uprising in 1794.

The Voivodeship consisted of three parts:
 Włodzimierz Land
 Dubno Land
 Kovel Land

References 
Volumina legum t. 10 Konstytucje Sejmu Grodzieńskiego z 1793 roku, Poznań 1952

Volhynia
History of Volyn Oblast
History of Rivne Oblast
Voivodeships of the Polish–Lithuanian Commonwealth